The Orpheum Theatre, originally the Pantages Theatre, is located at 1192 Market at Hyde, Grove and 8th Streets in the Civic Center district of San Francisco, California. The theatre first opened in 1926 as one of the many designed by architect B. Marcus Priteca for theater-circuit owner Alexander Pantages. The interior features a vaulted ceiling, while the facade is a Plateresque (Late Spanish Gothic) Revival. The Orpheum seats 2,197 patrons. In 1998,  after a previous renovation in the 1970s, a $20 million renovation was completed to make the Orpheum more suitable for Broadway shows. The theatre is a locally designated San Francisco landmark as determined by the San Francisco Landmarks Preservation Advisory Board.

The Orpheum, as well as the Golden Gate Theatre  in San Francisco, are owned by BroadwaySF, a theatrical producing company owned by Robert Nederlander.

History
In April 1998 the Kern/Hammerstein musical "Show Boat" was the first production staged in the reconstructed and expanded theater. 

The theater has hosted numerous Broadway shows, including a two-year sit-down production of the musical Wicked from January 27, 2009 through September 2010. The Grateful Dead gave six performances here on July 12-18, 1976. From April 30 to May 4, 2007 the theatre hosted Late Night with Conan O'Brien. 

Productions that were staged at the Orpheum prior to opening on Broadway have included Bring It On: The Musical (2011-2012), Evita (1979), Mamma Mia! (2000-2001), and The Act (1977).

References

External links 

BroadwaySF, owner of the Orpheum

Theatres in San Francisco
Market Street (San Francisco)
Vaudeville theaters
San Francisco Designated Landmarks
Event venues established in 1926
Theatres completed in 1926
1926 establishments in California
Gothic Revival architecture in California